Osdorp is neighbourhood of Amsterdam, Netherlands. A larger area was, from 1981 until 2010, a stadsdeel (borough) of Amsterdam and in 2010 was merged into the new borough of Amsterdam Nieuw-West.

Neighborhood
The core neighborhood of Osdorp is centered on Osdorpplein square and its 150-store shopping center. As the borough of Nieuw-West officially defines neighborhoods, Osdorp is actually split between the neighborhoods of "Nieuw-West Midden" and "Osdorp West".

Former borough
The former borough of Osdorp contained the following neighborhoods:
 Osdorp
 De Aker* (Middelveldsche Akerpolder)
 Lutkemeer
 Ookmeer
 Oud Osdorp (former village)
 Sloten (village, now officially part of the neighborhood "Sloten and Nieuw-Sloten"*)

References

Amsterdam Nieuw-West
Neighbourhoods of Amsterdam
Former boroughs of Amsterdam